Artatama may refer to:

 Artatama I a fifteenth-century BC king of Mitanni
 Artatama II an usurper to the throne of Tushratta of Mitanni